Carlo Parlati (1934–2003?) was an Italian sculptor. He was born in Torre del Greco in the Province of Naples. Some of his works are on display in the Museo Liverino in Torre del Greco including his innovative coral sculptures.

References

20th-century Italian sculptors
20th-century Italian male artists
Italian male sculptors
1934 births
Year of death missing
People from Torre del Greco